Luis Molina may refer to:

 Luis de Molina (1535–1600), Spanish Jesuit priest and theologian
 Luis Molina (boxer) (1938–2013), American boxer
 Luis Molina (rugby union) (born 1959), Argentine rugby union player
 Luis Manuel Molina (born 1959), Cuban musician, composer and broadcaster
 Luis Molina (baseball) (born 1974), Nicaraguan baseball coach
 Luis Pedro Molina (born 1977), Guatemalan football goalkeeper
 Luis Molina (athlete) (born 1988), Argentine athlete
 Luis Molina (politician) (born 1949), Peruvian politician
 Louis Molina (born 1972), New York City Corrections Commissioner